2007 Nürburgring GP2 Series round was a GP2 Series motor race held on 21 July and 22 July at the Nürburgring in Nürburg, Germany. It was the sixth round of the 2007 GP2 Series season. The race was used to support the 2007 European Grand Prix.

Classification

Qualifying

Feature race

Sprint race

References

Nurburgring Gp2 Round, 2007
Nurburgring
Sport in Rhineland-Palatinate